Petr Coufal (born 25 February 1995) is a Czech figure skater. He qualified to the free skate at seven ISU Championships, including the 2015 European Championships where he finished 12th. His best World Junior Championship result, tenth, came in 2014. He won a bronze medal at the 2014 Bavarian Open.

Coufal is the brother of Jana Coufalová, who is also a competitive skater. Their mother, Alena (née Drevjana), competed at the Olympics in gymnastics.

Programs

Competitive highlights 
CS: Challenger Series; JGP: Junior Grand Prix

References

External links 

 
 Petr Coufal at Tracings

1995 births
Czech male single skaters
Living people
People from Bohumín
Sportspeople from the Moravian-Silesian Region